Jamie Meltzer is an American movie and documentary film director. He has made "True Conviction", "Off the Charts: The Song-Poem Story", "Welcome to Nollywood", "La Caminata" (a short film), and the feature-length documentary film "Informant". He teaches documentary film production in the Art Department of Stanford University, as part of the  MFA Program in Documentary Film.

"True Conviction" (2017), a feature-length documentary, follows a group of exonerated ex-prisoners who start a detective agency, work to rebuild their lives, and struggle to fix the criminal justice system. The film was awarded a Special Jury Mention at the 2017 Tribeca Film Festival.

"Informant" (2012) a feature-length documentary film that investigates the turbulent journey of Brandon Darby, a radical leftist activist turned FBI informant turned right-wing Tea Party activist. It premiered at the 2012 San Francisco International Film Festival,"With uncommon restraint, Meltzer delivers a fascinating study that transcends political chest beating. Informant raises the possibility of fluid truth in a system addicted to false binaries." The film won the Best Documentary Jury Award at the Austin Film Festival in October 2012.

"La Caminata" (2009) is a short film exploring the efforts of a small Mexican town to combat the migration of their community to the U.S. The town, El Alberto, puts on a weekly tourist event called the Caminata, where they simulate a nighttime "crossing" of the border, complete with balaclava-clad coyotes and simulated border patrol in hot pursuit. The film played at film festivals in 2009, including the AFI Silverdocs Festival and the True/False Film Festival.

"Welcome to Nollywood" (2007) is a documentary about the explosive phenomenon of Nigerian movies. It aired on PBS as part of the AfroPop Series in 2008.

"Off the Charts: The Song-Poem Story" (2003), an hour-long documentary, marks his feature film debut. It played at festivals worldwide, and was screened on PBS' Independent Lens series in 2003.

"Pegasus" (1998), a short 16 mm film made while he was a graduate student at San Francisco State University, chronicles the adventures of a gay motorcycle club on a joy ride in Marin County. This film was screened at the 1998 San Francisco International Lesbian & Gay Film Festival as well as other venues.

References

External links
Jamie Meltzer official site

Off the Charts website
Welcome to Nollywood official website
La Caminata official website
website for INFORMANT

American documentary filmmakers
Living people
Year of birth missing (living people)
Place of birth missing (living people)
San Francisco State University alumni